U.S. Representative Mark Takai, who represented Hawaii's 1st congressional district, died July 20, 2016. A special election was held November 8, 2016. In special elections in Hawaii, all candidates run on one ballot with the highest vote recipient winning regardless of percentage. This is what allowed Charles Djou, a Republican, to win the 2010 special election for this district with 39.4% of the vote when two Democrats took 58.4% of the vote combined. However this special election is held concurrently with the 2016 general election.

Candidates
Candidate filing took place from August 15 to August 25.

Declared

Democratic Party
Colleen Hanabusa, former U.S. Representative

Republican Party
Shirlene Dela Cruz Ostrov, retired U.S. Air Force Colonel

Results

See also
List of special elections to the United States House of Representatives

References

Hawaii 2016 01
Hawaii 2016 01
2016 01 Special
Hawaii 01 Special
United States House of Representatives 01 Special
United States House of Representatives 2016 01